Hampton & Richmond Borough Football Club is an English semi-professional football club based in the suburb of Hampton, in the London Borough of Richmond upon Thames. They were founded in 1921 and formerly known as Hampton FC until 1999 when they changed their name in an attempt to draw a wider support base from around the borough. As of the 2021–22 season, they compete in the National League South, at the sixth tier of English football.

Hampton & Richmond Borough remains the only senior-level football club to represent the borough of Richmond upon Thames, but arguably struggles in attendance due to the popularity of rugby union in the borough. The club has a core support base of around 600 to 800 people. Before the start of the 2022/23 season, a new badge was revealed, which was designed by Lifelong fan Nick Taylor. There was a good response to this from many Hampton fans.

History

Early years
Hampton's early years were spent in the Kingston & District and the South West Middlesex Leagues. Although twice winning the Kingston & District title in the early 1930s the club never managed to capture the South West Middlesex League title during their 26-year stay.

Senior football
In 1959, Hampton entered the senior football ranks as members of the Surrey Senior League, despite being based in Middlesex. In 1964 they won the championship and stepped up into the Spartan League where they enjoyed seven seasons of unparalleled success. The club captured the Spartan League title four times in 1965, 1966, 1967 and 1970 as well as finishing runners-up in 1968. They never finished outside the top four places during their stay.

In 1971 they were elected to the Second Division of the Athenian League. After narrowly missing promotion in their first season, Hampton finished runners-up to Ruislip Manor in 1973. By this time, though, the Beavers had already been elected to the newly formed Second Division (now First Division) of the Isthmian League.

Isthmian League to 2003
The club were to remain in Division Two of the Isthmian League until 1990, when they suffered their first relegation. Worse was to follow as the two regionalised Second Divisions were split in 1991 to form a Second and Third set-up. The Beavers found themselves one place below the dividing line and were relegated to the Third Division for the 1991–92 season. Although missing automatic promotion by one place, the club was promoted at the Isthmian AGM to fill a vacancy in the Second Division and so began the recovery.

In the mid-1990s, under long-serving manager Chick Botley, the Beavers began to climb up the leagues again, winning promotion from the second division in 1995–96, and then gaining promotion from the first division in 1997–98 after finishing in 3rd place. Hampton started 1998–99 in the Premier Division – now the top tier of Isthmian League football. In 1999–00, they became the first winners of the George Ruffell Memorial Shield. They remained in the Premier Division until 2002–03, which led to relegation and a return to Division One.

The Devonshire years
In the summer of 2003, the club invited experienced manager Alan Devonshire, who had just left Maidenhead United, to the Beveree. Alan signed as manager and had the task of winning promotion back to the Premier Division, this was achieved on the last day of his first season in charge with a 3–0 win at Leatherhead.

Hampton & Richmond subsequently spent three seasons in the Premier Division, each time coming close to promotion to the Conference South after finishing as runners up in the play-off competition in 2005–06, and narrowly missing out on a play-off place in 2004–05.

On 28 April 2007, Hampton & Richmond Borough were promoted as champions of the league to the Conference South after a 4–2 victory over Slough Town. The crowd of nearly 1,100 witnessed an epic match in which Hampton led 2–1 until a late Slough goal looked to have given the championship to promotion rivals, Bromley.  This would have forced Hampton into 2nd place, meaning that they would have had to compete in the playoff competition for promotion. However, 90 seconds later Hampton retook the lead through a goal from Stuart Lake and shortly afterwards a penalty was awarded and scored by Elliott Godfrey, resulting in a 4–2 victory, and automatic promotion for the Beavers.

Hampton & Richmond Borough quickly established themselves in the Conference South in the sixth tier of English football. In 2007–08 they finished in 3rd position in the league, reaching the play-off final which was narrowly lost to Eastbourne Borough. The following season they suffered yet more heartbreak in the play-off final, losing 2–3 at their home ground to Hayes & Yeading United, having qualified as runners-up to AFC Wimbledon. A curious fact is that both AFC Wimbledon and Hayes & Yeading United found out they would be going up at Hampton's Beveree ground.  The club also reached the First Round Proper of the FA Cup for only the second time in their history in 2007, losing to League Two side, Dagenham & Redbridge in front of over 2,000 fans.

The club recorded its first record attendance at the start of the 2008–09 season when Hampton entertained a full strength West Ham United side that included Dean Ashton, Craig Bellamy and Robert Green. West Ham ran out 4–2 winners in front of a crowd of over 3,000. Since then, several matches, including the Conference South play-off final in May 2009, have been played in front of capacity crowds. The play-off even recorded more than 1,000 people who couldn't get into the stadium for the match.

On 29 January 2009 the club received a record transfer fee for its 20-year-old striker Ben Wright as he moved to League One side Peterborough United. It had been widely reported that Wright was to make the move to Premier League Fulham, but Peterborough beat Fulham to the punch to sign up 'the hottest property in non-league football'. As part of the deal, the club received a substantial cash amount and would receive further funds based on goals and appearances for the Posh, as well as a sell-on fee. However Wright failed to impress.

After Devonshire
In May 2011, Devonshire accepted the position of first team manager at Braintree Town, who had just been promoted to the Conference National. In his place, Mark Harper, Devonshire's assistant in the 2010–11 season, was appointed to the position of first team manager for the club's 5th season in the Conference South.

In 2011–12, in progressing to the FA Trophy 3rd round, the club had had its best performance in England's premier non-league cup competition. However, they suffered in the league and were relegated on the final day of the season.

The following season, 2012–13, started off brightly in the Isthmian League Premier Division, as the club were looking for immediate promotion back to the Conference South. However, the good form disappeared and after a 3–0 defeat to bottom team Carshalton Athletic on 1 April, Mark Harper resigned his position as first team manager. The management for the remaining games of the season was handed to first team coach Paul Barry and player Darren Powell. The pair subsequently were appointed in the position permanently.

After a poor start to the 2014–15 season, Barry and Powell resigned on 13 September, following a 3–2 defeat away to VCD Athletic in the FA Cup. Earlier that week, the club had suffered a 6–4 defeat at home to Leiston in the Isthmian League Premier Division.

The Dowson era
Former Kingstonian manager Alan Dowson was appointed to replace Barry and Powell the following day. After spending the rest of the 2014–15 season working to prevent relegation, ending the season in 15th, Dowson then guided the Beavers to the Isthmian League title in 2015–16.

A strong start to life in the National League South in the 2016–17 season saw Hampton's skilful young players step into the spotlight and in the January 2017 transfer window, leading scorers Jamal Lowe and Nicke Kabamba both signed for League Two club Portsmouth.

The team maintained that strong start, finishing the season in 7th and thus qualified for the end of season playoffs, albeit through the failure of the two clubs immediately above them to achieve correct ground gradings. They met eventual playoff winners in the two-legged semi-final, Ebbsfleet United, and lost 4–2 on aggregate.

After a poor start to the 2017–18 season, Hampton then went on an unbeaten run of 21 games, which took them into the playoff places by Christmas.  They ended the season in 4th place and entered the playoffs.  After beating Truro City 3–1 and Chelmsford City 1–0, they faced Braintree Town in the promotion final, held at Beveree.  After extra time, the match ended 1–1, Braintree Town then winning the penalty shootout 4–3.

This turned out to be Alan Dowson's last game in charge of the team, as he left to take charge of Woking 2 days later.

Gary McCann
On 1 June 2018 Hampton announced the former Hendon manager, Gary McCann, as the new manager. During his time as manager he has led the side to 2 Fa Cup First Rounds and twice finished in the playoffs, however these seasons were curtailed due to COVID-19

Stadium

The home of Hampton & Richmond Borough is Beveree Stadium, Beaver Close, Hampton, Middlesex, TW12 2BX. It has a total capacity of 3,500, with roughly 640 of this being seated and 900 in covered terracing. On 11 October 2005, that capacity was tested with a crowd of 2,020 turning out for an Isthmian League match between Hampton & Richmond Borough and AFC Wimbledon. The match ended in a 2–1 victory for the home side.

On 18 April 2009, a record crowd of 3,225 turned up for the match against AFC Wimbledon which resulted in a 1–1 draw. This was topped with the Conference South Playoff Final of that season as a capacity crowd of 3,500 saw the Beavers denied a position in the Conference national by local rivals Hayes & Yeading United, as the visitors won 3–2.

Beveree, which can be shortened to 'the Bev', has been the home of the club since 1959. It is also the home of the Hampton & Richmond Borough Academy, plus other affiliated clubs such as Hampton & Richmond Borough Women F.C., Hampton Under 18s, Chelsea Ladies FC before May 2006; and the Hampton & Richmond Borough reserve team, which was restarted in 2008 after a four-year stretch with no reserve squad but was since discontinued in 2015.

Not just a football ground, Beveree is also used for social events. The club's ground has been used as a polling station for all local, general and European elections for a long time.

In June 2006, work began on transforming the clubhouse and changing rooms at Beveree into a more modern facility. Work was completed by the end of summer, and the new look clubhouse was officially opened by FA Chief Executive, Brian Barwick, on 26 August 2006. The new facility has a pool table and flat screen TVs and is WiFi enabled.

In April 2008 the club received a Conference B grading for Beveree, following several weeks of work, which included the installation of additional toilet facilities, an extra turnstile, new dugouts and the extension of the Main Stand with 60 additional seats and the purchase of 250–seater semi-permanent stand. The B grading enables the club to remain in the Conference South.

The seating stand behind the goal at Beveree Stadium is named after Alan Simpson, known for co-writing Steptoe & Son, who was the president of Hampton & Richmond Borough Football Club for nearly 50 years.

The nickname
The club is nicknamed the Beavers and there is some debate as to its origins. The ground is known as Beveree – after the nearby house from whose grounds it was originally part of – and it lies adjacent to Beaver Close, which would seem to suggest as to where the tag originates although Beaver Close was built after the ground.

Following the renaming of the club from Hampton to Hampton & Richmond Borough, occasionally 'come on the Borough' is heard but generally, the fans prefer 'Beavers' to anything else, which is reflected in the naming of the club's youth group as the 'Hampton Beavers' and the supporters sometimes referring to themselves self-deprecatingly as the 'Beaver Patrol'. An alternative and somewhat humorous chant often heard emanating from the crowds behind the home goal is 'Up the Beavers'.

Club rivals
Hampton & Richmond's main football rivalry is with Staines Town.  The two sides have played against each other in the 'Thames-side Derby' many times, the most recent encounter being in Boxing Day 2016 when the Beavers won 3–2 at Beveree.  The rivalry started around 40 years ago when the two sides played each other in a thrilling match.  Thames-side Derby matches tend to attract a much increased crowd figure.

More recent and low-key local rivals, which have resulted from Hampton playing in the same division as the sides, are with AFC Wimbledon, Walton & Hersham, Molesey, Chertsey Town Kingstonian and Walton Casuals

Records
The club's record victory is an 11–1 triumph over Eastbourne United in the division two South of the Isthmian League in 1990–91. Their record defeat is a 13–0 loss against Hounslow Town in the Middlesex Senior Cup in 1962–3.

Goalkeeper Alan Cooling's goal for the Beavers in the FA Cup 4th round qualifying against Barnet in November 1977 is thought to be the first goal scored by a goalkeeper in the FA Cup.

At the start of the 2012–13 season, the club extended a 45-year-old club record by going 7 consecutive games without conceding a goal; from the final game of the 2011–12 season in which they beat Thurrock 2–0, the team went a further 6 games into the 2012–13 season, before Lowestoft Town's Jack Defty scored in the 1–1 draw between the teams.

On Tuesday 22 March 2016 the Beavers took on Cockfosters FC at Beveree in a Middlesex FA Charity Cup match.  The final score at the end of 90 minutes was 1–1 and the game was decided on kicks from the penalty spot. After 42 kicks were taken in total (21 each), Cockfosters' Courtney Lawrence beat Hampton keeper Adrian Blake to give the Fosters the win 18–17, after Hampton's Rylan Myers' kick had been saved by Fosters keeper Austin Byfield.

This is a record.

In the 2017–18 season, the Beavers also set the National League South record for the most draws in a season with 18 draws, beating the previous record of 17.

Current squad

Out on loan/dual-registration

International players
Jamal Lowe – Estonia vs England C
Lowe became the first player to represent England C while with the Beavers when he was selected to play in the International Challenge Trophy game in Tallinn. He was the only member of the squad to be selected from a National League South team.

In the starting line up, he scored the goal in the 13th minute that took the team to the ICT final against Slovakia in Spring 2017.

In 2022 Brandon Barzey was selected for the Monserrat national team. He made 3 appearances as a substitute for. In those appearances Brandon won 2 penalties, which were both converted by Montserrat captain Lyle Taylor

Managers
from 1959 to 1960 season when the club achieved Senior status

Correct to 2023-03-04

Most appearances

to end of 2017–18 season

Leading scorers
to end of 2017–18 season

Honours

Hampton & Richmond Borough's most recent major honour is their Isthmian Premier League Championship victory of 2015–16. After heading the table in January, they fought a close battle with East Thurrock Utd and Bognor Regis Town, which was only settled on the final day of the season. A point from a hard-fought 0–0 draw at home to Enfield Town was enough to see them to the title as Bognor put in a late run, the Rocks ending a point behind the Beavers with the same goal difference.

In May 2014, the club also won the Middlesex Senior Cup following a 3–2 victory over Wealdstone, that season's Isthmian League champions.  Their previous trophy outside of this had been the Middlesex Super Cup, a regional cup for the county of Middlesex, whereby the winners of the previous season's two local tournaments face each other. Hampton & Richmond won this on 10 October 2006, they entered as the Middlesex Senior Cup holders, and were victorious over Harrow Borough, the Middlesex Charity Cup holders.

League
National League South (Tier 6)
Runners-up: 2008–09
Play Off Finalists: 2007–08, 2008–09, 2017–18.
Play Off Semi-finalists: 2016–17
Isthmian League Premier (Tier 7)
Champions (2): 2006–07, 2015–16
Isthmian League Division One South (Tier 8)
Promoted: 2003–04
Isthmian League Division One (Tier 7)
Promoted: 1997–98
Isthmian League Division Two (Tier 8)
Promoted: 1995–96
Isthmian League Division Three (Tier 9)
Promoted: 1991–92
Spartan League
Champions 1964–65, 1965–66, 1966–67, 1969–70

Cups
Isthmian League Cup
Runners-up: 2001–02, 2004–05
Middlesex Senior Cup
Winners: 2005–06, 2007–08, 2011–12, 2013–14 & 2016–17
Runners-up: 2004–05
Middlesex Super Cup
Winners: 1999–2000 and 2006–07

References

External links

Official website
Supporter's Trust website

 
Football clubs in London
Football clubs in England
National League (English football) clubs
Sport in the London Borough of Richmond upon Thames
Isthmian League
Athenian League
1921 establishments in England
Association football clubs established in 1921
Hampton, London